Zakir Khan (born 20 August 1987) is an Indian comedian and  actor. In 2012, he rose to popularity by winning Comedy Central India's Best Stand Up Comedian competition. Khan has also been a part of a news comedy show, On Air with AIB. He has also released three-hour length standup specials: Haq Se Single (2017), Kaksha Gyarvi (2018) and Tathastu (2022) on Amazon Prime Video.

Early life 
Khan was born and raised in Indore, Madhya Pradesh to a rajasthani muslim family of classical musicians. He is the grandson of Sarangi Maestro Ustad Moinuddin Khan. He spent a large portion of his adult life in Delhi. He comes from a humble background and credits his father with being supportive of his talent.

Career 
Khan has a diploma in Sitar and is a college dropout.  He has stated that had he not been a standup comedian, he would instead be working as a music teacher. He became a known face in India's stand-up comedy circuit in 2012 when he won the title of 'India's Best Stand Up', a comedy competition organized by Comedy Central. Besides performing at many stand-up comedy shows, he has also ghostwritten and produced radio shows. His comedy style was applauded in NDTV Prime's The Rising Stars of Comedy television show. Khan is known for his punchline "Sakht Launda" which refers to a guy with immense self-control who doesn't easily fall for girls. He also performed with Joke Singh at Gurgaon.

He is an emerging Urdu Poet and comes from a family of artists. He has presented his poetry in events like Rekhta. On his train journey to Delhi, he wrote first poem, "Mai Soonya Pe Sawar Hoon". He also wrote "Apne Aap Ke Bhi Piche Khara Hoon Main", "Bus Ka Intezar Karte Huye".

In September 2017, Khan appeared as one of the three mentors along with Mallika Dua   and Hussain Dalal for the fifth season of The Great Indian Laughter Challenge, judged by actor Akshay Kumar. He has more than six million subscribers on YouTube and is known for works like his Amazon Prime special Haq Se Single.

Khan wrote and played the protagonist in the Amazon Prime web series Chacha Vidhayak Hain Humare.

In 2015, Khan co-hosted and wrote On Air with AIB, a news comedy show, with Sorabh Pant and Gursimran Khamba from the Indian comedy group All India Bakchod. The show was broadcast on Star World, India. Khan co-hosted the 5th Annual Golden Kela Awards.

He also appeared as one of the judges in Amazon Prime's Comicstaan Season 2 where he mentored the contestants in a genre of comedy known as anecdotal comedy. He also went on to be one of the four judges in Season 3.

Khan has also featured in the recent Amazon Prime's One Mic Stand Season 1 alongside Bhuvan Bam

He has also begun his show called Farzi Mushaira which is available on Amazon mini TV.

Apart from comedy, he has also generated podcast series Ummeed on Gaana, where he shares the inspiration he got from incidents in his life, along with his other comedian friends.

Filmography

Television

Web series

Web

References

External links 
 
 

1987 births
Living people
Indian stand-up comedians
Indian theatre people
Indian comedians
Artists from Madhya Pradesh
Male comedians